Green & Black's is a British chocolate company founded in 1991. The company produces a range of organic food products, including: chocolate bars, ice cream, biscuits and hot chocolate.

Green & Black's was bought by Cadbury in 2005, and later became part of Mondelēz International (formerly known as Kraft Foods). It has principal manufacturing sites in Canada, Poland, and Italy.

History

Founding
Green & Black's was founded in 1991 by the couple Craig Sams and Josephine Fairley, organic food pioneer and journalist respectively. The name was derived from a wordplay — "Green" standing for the environmental concerns of the founders, and "Black" for the high cocoa solids chocolate they wished to provide.  In 1994, the company began purchasing Fairtrade cocoa from Maya farmers in Belize for the Maya Gold chocolate bar, and was awarded the Worldaware Business Award in 1994 for good business practice, as well as the UK's first Fairtrade mark. The company has a small office in Punta Gorda, Belize.

Ownership changes and fairtrade
In May 2005, Cadbury Schweppes (latterly Cadbury plc) bought Green & Black's for an undisclosed sum, estimated to be around £20m. Cadbury pledged to run the company as a separate business.

Green & Black's Australia chocolate announced that it would convert 90% of its range to Fairtrade by the end of 2010, and its entire range by 2011.
In August 2017 the company launched its first product line, the Velvet Edition, which is neither Fair Trade nor Organic.

Operations
Green & Black's has operations around the world, including the United States, United Kingdom, Canada, Australia, and other nations.

United States
Green & Black's sells chocolate bars in the United States. They are sold in stores such as Whole Foods Market and Walgreens.  They have various chocolate bars, in various flavors such as "Dark 85% Cacao" and "White". All are Fairtrade Certified.

Recalls
On 15 October 2012 Mondelēz Global LLC conducted voluntary U.S. recall of Green & Black's organic peanut and sea salt milk chocolate bar due to possible health risk.

Books
 Sweet Dreams – The Story of Green & Black’s Craig Sams and Josephine Fairley,  (2008) Random House

See also
 List of chocolate bar brands

Notes

Further reading
 BBC News: Kraft takes over Cadburys (2 February 2010)
 BBC News: Cadbury gobbles up organic rival (13 May 2005)
 The Guardian: interview with Craig Sams (16 May 2005)
 The Observer: How a £1.50 chocolate bar saved a Mayan community from destruction (28 May 2006)

External links
 Official website
 Green & Black's profile 
 http://www.craigsams.com
 Green & Black's Australia going Fair Trade. The Fair Trade Association of Australia and New Zealand
 FDA FDA U.S. Food and Drug administration: Recalls (Last Updated: 15 October 2012)

1991 establishments in England
British chocolate companies
Cadbury brands
Fair trade brands
Food and drink companies established in 1991
Ice cream brands
Mondelez International brands
Organic chocolate
Organic farming organizations